Tehran is one of the most ethnically diverse cities in Asia. The city of Tehran (not to be confused with the larger, Tehran Metropolitan) had a population of approximately 8,293,140 in 2011 and the Tehran Province has a 12,183,391 population.

Population

Ethnic groups

Persians
According to a 2010 census conducted by the Sociology Department of Tehran University in many districts of Tehran across various socio-economic classes in proportion to the population sizes of each district and socio-economic class, 63% of people in Tehran were born in Tehran, 98% can speak the Persian language, 75% identify themselves as ethnic Persians, and 13% have some degree of proficiency in a European language.

Azerbaijanis
Azerbaijanis in Tehran also known as Turks in Tehran or Azeris in Tehran are Iranians of Azerbaijani ethnicity. Azerbaijanis comprise 25% of Tehran's population and 20.3% – 25% of Tehran Province's population.

Mazanderanis
Ethnic Mazanderanis are the third-largest, comprising about 17% of the total population.

See also
 Tehran demographics

References

Tehran
tehran
Tehran